Emiliyan Vergov (born 29 August 1942) is a Bulgarian former sports shooter. He competed at the 1968, 1972 and the 1976 Summer Olympics.

References

1942 births
Living people
Bulgarian male sport shooters
Olympic shooters of Bulgaria
Shooters at the 1968 Summer Olympics
Shooters at the 1972 Summer Olympics
Shooters at the 1976 Summer Olympics
Sportspeople from Stara Zagora
20th-century Bulgarian people